The Linear Men are a fictional superhero team in the DC Comics universe. They first appeared in Adventures of Superman #476 (March 1991).

Fictional history
The Linear Men are a team of men and women who police time and work to resolve time paradoxes. The core team consists of Matthew Ryder (the leader and founder), an alternate future version of Ryder known as Waverider, Travis O'Connell, Liri Lee, Rayak the Ravager and Rip Hunter, although other members of the Linear Men have been seen from time to time. An alternate Matthew, one who was once employed by Lex Luthor, became part of the team.

They operate in a base that exists during the last possible moment in the universe, the last nanosecond before entropy ends everything, called Vanishing Point.

Their name is taken from the premise that after the Crisis on Infinite Earths, time is strictly linear and paradoxes can unravel the sole remaining timeline. Thanks to Rip Hunter, they remain blissfully ignorant of Hypertime.

Before the Crisis, Travis O'Connell perishes when he detonates the moon in AD 2995. This is exactly what was supposed to happen and Travis O'Connell's sacrifice keeps the timeline on track.

During Gog's attack on Superman, killing him in his present and then travelling back to the previous day to do it again, the Linear Men were shaken at the lack of anomalies on their equipment; Superman was being constantly killed, and yet their records still showed him as being alive in the 853rd century without any errors. Rip Hunter explained this anomaly to key DC heroes when he revealed the existence of Hypertime, a mass of alternate timelines, which he had kept secret from the Linear Men due to their inability to accept its existence, subsequently going on the run from his former colleagues after he took the Superman, Batman, and Wonder Woman from the year 2020 - along with the children of various other heroes - back in time to 1999 to help the younger 'Trinity' stop Gog.

The Linear Men help Superman fight the threat of Dominus. They are featured heavily in the comic book title Chronos, which featured Walker Gabriel. Gabriel is accused of the murder of a Linear Man agent. Another Linear Agent pursues the protagonist throughout time, including the town of Smallville during its very early 'Wild West' days. This agent is also opposed by a small, time-traveling troupe of entertainers. This series also noted a rather important fact to the Linear Men: they are not aware of the Crisis on Infinite Earths, while this small group does know about the former multiverse, as noted by the villain Konstantin Vyronis.

Rip Hunter eventually locks the Linear Men away for unknown reasons. In the Time Masters: Vanishing Point limited series, it is revealed that Rip and the Linear Men were never in agreement about how to handle time and that Rip, tired of the Linear Men's interference, locked them away in a cell at Vanishing Point. Later, Matthew Ryder and Liri Lee are freed from their imprisonment by the Time Stealers: Black Beetle, Despero, Per Degaton and Ultra-Humanite. Black Beetle intends to use the Linear Men to bring Waverider to life, but Supernova prevents Black Beetle from dystopia and sends the Time Stealers back to the present. However, Black Beetle is able to escape, and the Linear Men go with him. They then teleport through time to search for Waverider's corpse in the future Earth's desolate wasteland. After Black Beetle finds Waverider's corpse, he double-crosses them, revealing his plan to use Waverider's power to become invulnerable. Black Beetle attempts to fuse with the power of Waverider's corpse, but is thwarted by Supernova. Instead, Liri fuses with Waverider's corpse to become Linear Woman, after which Black Beetle escapes. Rip and the rest of the Time Masters arrive but Linear Woman refuses to agree with Rip's rules of time travel and teleports herself and Matthew through the timestream.

In other media
The Arrowverse series DC's Legends of Tomorrow is based on Linear Men, with its current members being Sara Lance/White Canary, Waverider/Gideon,
Atom (Ray Palmer), Mick Rory, Nate Heywood, Zari Tomaz, Wally West, John Constantine, Hawkman, Hawkgirl, Rip Hunter, Jefferson Jackson, Martin Stein, Leonard Snart and Amaya Jiwe.

In season one, Time Master Rip Hunter goes rogue after Vandal Savage murders Hunter's family. Intending to stop Savage, Hunter recruits a team consisting of Ray Palmer, Sara Lance, Martin Stein, Jefferson Jackson, Kendra Saunders, Carter Hall, Leonard Snart, and Mick Rory. They discover that the Time Masters are backing Savage in his domination of the world in 2166 to facilitate a successful repulsion of a Thanagarian invasion. Due to Snart's sacrifice, the Time Masters are destroyed.

In season two, with the Time Masters defeated, the team guard the timeline themselves, and cope with Rip's absence after he disappears. However, they are plagued by the Legion of Doom, a time-travelling team led by Reverse Flash (Eobard Thawne), who has recruited versions of Damien Darhk, Malcolm Merlyn, and Leonard Snart to find the Biblical Spear of Destiny, with which they can alter their fates. The team is joined by Amaya Jiwe, an African superhero from the Justice Society of America and Nate Heywood, a modern-day historian who acquires the power to become solid metal and revert to normal skin.

In season three, the team discover that they created anachronisms throughout time, and Rip has formed the Time Bureau to help fix them. Rip tells the team of the demon Mallus, whose follower Nora Darhk has resurrected her father Damien and Amaya's granddaughter Kuasa, also recruiting Gorilla Grodd so that they can release Mallus from his prison by perverting history. The team loses both members of Firestorm, but is joined by Zari Tomaz, a hacktivist from 2042 whose air-controlling amulet is connected to Amaya's totem, and Wally West, a speedster formerly under the tutelage of the Flash.

References

External links
The Unofficial Linear Men Fansite

Comics about time travel
DC Comics superhero teams
Comics characters introduced in 1991
Characters created by Dan Jurgens